Isa Tuwaijir (Arabic (عيسى علي التويجر) is a mechanical engineer and a Libyan politician born in the city of Tripoli in 1957. He was named Finance Minister on 22 November 2011 by Abdurrahim El-Keib.

External links
 Interim Government Official website
 Interim Government Official website (Executive Office)
 Official Bio on Interim Government Official website (Arabic)

References

Government ministers of Libya
Living people
Members of the National Transitional Council
Members of the Interim Government of Libya
1957 births
People of the First Libyan Civil War
University of Oregon alumni
Libyan engineers
Libyan Sunni Muslims